Tumak, also known as Toumak, Tumag, Tummok, Sara Toumak, Tumac, and Dije, is an Afro-Asiatic language spoken in the southwestern Chadian prefectures of Moyen-Chari and Koumra. Motun (Mod) and Tumak dialects have a lexical similarity of only 70%; Blench (2006) lists Tumak, Motun, and Mawer as separate languages. Most Motun speakers use some Sara.

The "Gulei" listed in Greenberg might be a dialect of Tumak.

References 

 Jean-Pierre Caprile, Lexique Tumak-Français (Tchad) (1975). Dietrich Reimer, 140 pp. .

East Chadic languages
Languages of Chad
Endangered Afroasiatic languages